The Seventh Development Cabinet was the Indonesian Cabinet which served under President Suharto and Vice President B. J. Habibie from 16 March 1998 to 21 May 1998.

The Cabinet was formed in the midst of the Asian financial crisis and after Suharto was elected to a 7th term as President by the People's Consultative Assembly (MPR). It was a controversial Cabinet where Suharto displayed his nepotism by appointing Siti Hardiyanti Rukmana as Minister of Social Welfare and gave Bob Hasan, a crony, the position of Minister of Industry and Trade. When things went out of control in May 1998, Suharto tried to reshuffle the Cabinet but the rejection of 14 Ministers to be part of the reshuffled Cabinet became one of the reasons why Suharto chose to resign from the Presidency.

The Four Cabinet Aims
Whilst announcing the Cabinet, Suharto also announced its aims.

The Development Trilogy: Consisting of national stability, economic growth, and equity as the tried and tested basis of the policy of development.
Self-Reliance: Letting the Nation go from reliance on other entities to self-confidence in the Nation's own abilities, and having the capability to face the unpredictableness of globalization.
National Resilience: National Resilience will grow out of self-reliance, togetherness, and familial spirit. This will consist of skill and strength of the Nation in facing challenges and threats.
Unity and Oneness: The two elements will strengthen National Resilience and will ensure the continuity of livelihood as a nation, state, and people with the 1945 Constitution and Pancasila as its basis.

President and Vice President

Coordinating Ministers
Coordinating Minister of Politics and Security: Gen. (ret.) Feisal Tanjung
Coordinating Minister of Economics, Finance, and Industry/Chairman of the National Development Planning Agency (BAPPENAS): Ginandjar Kartasasmita
Coordinating Minister of People's Welfare and Abolition of Poverty/Chairman of Planned Families National Coordinating Body (BKKBN): Haryono Suyono
Coordinating Minister of Development Supervision and State Apparatus Utilization: Hartarto Sastrosoenarto

Departmental Ministers
Minister of Home Affairs: Gen. (ret.) Hartono
Minister of Foreign Affairs: Ali Alatas
Minister of Defense and Security/Commander of ABRI: Gen. Wiranto
Minister of Justice: Muladi
Minister of Information: Alwi Dahlan
Minister of Finance: Fuad Bawazier
Minister of Industry and Trade: Bob Hasan
Minister of Mines and Energy: Kuntoro Mangkusubroto
Minister of Forestry and Plantation: Sumohadi
Minister of Agriculture: Sjarifuddin Baharsjah
Minister of Transportation: Giri Suseno Hadi Hardjono
Minister of Cooperatives and Small Business: Subiyakto Tjakrawerdaya
Minister of Manpower: Theo L. Sambuaga
Minister of Public Works: Rachmadi Bambang Sumadio
Minister of Transmigration and Forest Settlement: Lt. Gen. (ret.) AM Hendropriyono
Minister of Education and Culture: Wiranto Arismunandar
Minister of Tourism, Arts, and Culture: Abdul Latief
Minister of Health: Farid Anafasa Moeloek
Minister of Religious Affairs: Quraish Shihab
Minister of Social Affairs: Siti Hardiyanti Rukmana

State Ministers
State Minister/State Secretary: Saadilah Mursyid
State Minister of Research and Technology/Chairman of the Research and Implementation of Technology Board (BPPT): Rahardi Ramelan
State Minister of Investment/Chairman of the Investment Coordinating Body (BKPM): Sanyoto Sastrowardoyo
State Minister of Stateowned Enterprises: Tanri Abeng
State Minister of Agrarian Affairs/Chairman of the National Land Body (BPN): Ary Mardjono
State Minister of Housing: Akbar Tanjung
State Minister of Environment/Chairman of the Relief Effort and Containment of Environmental Disasters (BAPPEDAL): Juwono Sudarsono
State Minister of Foodstuffs, Horticulture, and Medicines: Haryanto Dhanutirto
State Minister of Youth and Sports: Agung Laksono
State Minister of Female Empowerment: Tutty Alawiyah

Official With Ministerial Rank
Governor of Bank Indonesia: Syahril Sabirin
Attorney General: Sudjono C. Atmanegara

Changes
16 May 1998: Abdul Latief resigned from his position as Minister of Tourism, Arts, and Culture. He was never replaced.

See also
Suharto

References

Notes

New Order (Indonesia)
Post-Suharto era
Cabinets of Indonesia
1998 establishments in Indonesia
1998 disestablishments in Indonesia
Cabinets established in 1998
Cabinets disestablished in 1998
Suharto